The West Virginia Legislature is the state legislature of the U.S. state of West Virginia. A bicameral legislative body, the legislature is split between the upper Senate and the lower House of Delegates. It was established under Article VI of the West Virginia Constitution following the state's split from Virginia during the American Civil War in 1863. As with its neighbor and former constituent Virginia General Assembly, the legislature's lower house is also referred to as a "House of Delegates."

The legislature convenes in the State Capitol building in Charleston.

Terms
Senators are elected for terms of four years and delegates for terms of two years. These terms are staggered, meaning that not all 34 State Senate seats are up every election: some are elected in presidential election years and some are up during midterm elections.

Organization
Regular sessions of the legislature commence on the second Wednesday of January of each year. However, following the election of a new governor, the session starts in January with the governor's address but then adjourns until February. On the first day of the session, members of both the House and the Senate sit in joint session in the House chamber where the governor presents his or her legislative program. The length of the general session may not go beyond 60 calendar days unless extended by a concurrent resolution adopted by a two-thirds vote of each house. The governor may convene the Legislature for extraordinary sessions. Given the part-time nature of the legislature of West Virginia, multiple extraordinary sessions are not uncommon.

Legislative process
Bills, even revenue bills, and resolutions may originate in either house. Bills must undergo three readings in each house before being sent to the governor. Bills cannot contain multiple subjects and do not take effect until 90 days following adjournment, unless specifically approved to take effect immediately by two-thirds of the membership of each house.

Bills are drafted by the Office of Legislative Services or legislative staff counsel, reviewed by the sponsor of the bill and submitted for introduction to the clerk of the chamber of which the sponsor is a member. Bills are assigned to committees that make recommendations about a bill in the form of a committee report.

The governor has the power to veto bills. For budget bills or supplementary appropriations bills, two-thirds of the members elected to each house are required to override the governor's veto of a bill or line-item veto. For all other bills, a simple majority of each house is required.

See also
West Virginia House of Delegates
West Virginia Senate
West Virginia State Capitol
List of members of the 80th West Virginia House of Delegates
List of members of the 80th West Virginia Senate

References

External links
West Virginia Legislature Homepage

 
Government of West Virginia
Bicameral legislatures